Articles (arranged alphabetically) related to Vietnam and Vietnamese culture include:



0–9

A
Army of the Republic of Vietnam (ARVN)
An Giang Province
Annam (French protectorate)
Annam (Chinese province)
Annamite Range
Association of Cities of Vietnam

B
Ba Bể National Park
Bà Rịa–Vũng Tàu province
Bắc Giang Province
Bắc Kạn Province
Bạc Liêu Province
Bắc Ninh Province
Bạch Mã National Park
Bảo Đại
Battle of Điện Biên Phủ
Bến Tre Province
Bình Định Province
Bình Dương Province
Bình Phước Province
Bình Thuận Province
Bình Triệu Bridge
Boat people

C
Cà Mau Province
Cam Ranh
Cần Thơ
Cần Thơ municipality
Cát Bà Island and National Park
Cát Tiên National Park
Cao Bằng Province
Cao gío
Chữ nôm
Chữ Nho
Cinema of Vietnam
Cochinchina
Communications in Vietnam
Cổ Định chromium mine
Culture of Vietnam

D
Đà Nẵng municipality
Đắk Lắk Province
Đắk Nông Province
Degar
Democratic Republic of Vietnam
Demographics of Vietnam
Điện Biên Phủ
Điện Biên Province
Đồng Nai Province
Đồng Tháp Province

E
Economy of Vietnam
EQuest Education Group

F
Fansipan/Fan Si Pan/Phan Xi Păng
First Indochina War
Foreign relations of Vietnam
French Indochina

G
Geography of Vietnam
Gia Lai Province
Giai Truong Son: see Annamite Range
Gulf of Tonkin

H
Hà Giang Province
Hà Nam Province
Hà Nội municipality
Hà Tây Province
Hà Tĩnh Province
Hải Dương Province
Hải Phòng/Haiphong municipality
Han-Nom
Hậu Giang Province
History of Vietnam
Hồ Chí Minh municipality.
Hồ Chí Minh
Hòa Bình Province
Hoàng Thị Tuân
Hội An
Hong Gai
Horn (diacritic)
Hưng Yên Province
Huỳnh Ngọc Sỹ

I
Indochina
Ipa-Nima

J

K
Khaisilk
Khánh Hòa Province
Kiên Giang Province
Kim Sơn
Kon Tum Province

L
Lai Châu Province
Lâm Đồng Province
Lạng Sơn Province
Lào Cai Province
Lào Cai
Lê Quý Đôn
Lệ Xuân/Madame Ngô Đình Nhu
List of ethnic groups in Vietnam
List of museums in Vietnam
Long An Province
Long Xuyên

M
Marble Mountains (Vietnam)
Media of Vietnam
Mekong River
Military of Vietnam
Music of Vietnam

N
Nam Định Province
National Front for the Liberation of Vietnam
Nghệ An Province
Nghia-Sinh International
Ngô Đình Diệm
Ngô Đình Nhu
Nguyễn dynasty
Nguyễn Thái
Nguyễn Thành Phương
Nha Trang
Amu Nhan
Ninh Bình Province
Ninh Thuận Province
Nordic Assistance to Vietnam
North Vietnam
North Vietnamese Army

O

P
Pentagon Papers
Phan Xi Păng/Fan Si Pan/Fansipan
Phú Thọ Province
Phú Yên Province
Phung Khac Khoan
Politics of Vietnam
President of Vietnam
Prime Minister of Vietnam
Provinces of Vietnam
Pù Luông Nature Reserve

Q
Quảng Bình Province
Quảng Nam Province
Quảng Ngãi Province
Quảng Ninh Province
Quảng Trị Province
Qui Nhơn

R
Red River Delta

S
Sóc Trăng Province
Sơn La Province
South Vietnam

T
Tây Ninh Province
Temple of Literature, Hanoi
Temple of Literature, Hưng Yên
Temple of Literature, Mao Điền
Thái Bình Province
Thái Nguyên Province
Thanh Hóa Province
The Tale of Kiều
Thừa Thiên–Huế Province
Thy (name)
Tiền Giang Province
Tonkin
Trà Vinh Province
Trần Thị Hoa Ry
Transportation in Vietnam
Tuyên Quang Province
Têt

U

V
VietAbroader
Việt Cộng
Viet Kieu
Việt Minh
Vietnam
Vietnamese Family of Buddhists
Vietnam Television
Vietnam War
Vietnam Veterans Memorial
Vietnamese alphabet
Vietnamese-American
Vietnamese Communist Party
Vietnamese cuisine
Vietnamese Fatherland Front
Vietnamese language/tiếng Việt
Vietnamese Pharmaceutical Association
Vietnamese phonology
Vĩnh Long Province
Vĩnh Phúc Province
Vinh
Vinish
Visa requirements for Vietnamese citizens

W
 Water supply and sanitation in Vietnam

X

Y
Yên Bái Province

Z

 
Vietnam